Tropical Storm Bret was the second named storm of the 2011 Atlantic hurricane season. Bret formed along the southwestern periphery of a weather front north of the Bahamas on July 17. Steering currents in the area subsequently became better established, and Bret turned toward the northeast only to encounter a substantial increase in vertical wind shear. Despite the shear, the storm maintained a well-defined wind circulation for several days, with intermittent bursts of thunderstorms near its center.

Since Bret remained over the open Atlantic for most of its existence, its effects on land were limited. While moving little, the storm produced inclement weather and widespread cloudiness over much of the north-central Bahamas. Squalls off the eastern coast of Florida generated rough seas along coastlines, injuring a number of people. Although it stayed well offshore, the storm enhanced tropical moisture over Bermuda, causing beneficial rainfall in dry areas.

Meteorological history

In mid-July, 2011, a broad upper trough dropped southward over the northwest Atlantic, supporting a cold front that extended westward across Bermuda to inland over Georgia. The front produced a large area of light showers to its north, with its westernmost component remaining quasi-stationary over northeastern Florida. On July 16, a surface low developed along the decaying boundary, just off the coast, generating an area of sporadic convection north of the Bahamas. Although a wind circulation was initially absent and surface pressures were relatively high, the low later became better organized under abating shear conditions. It strengthened into Tropical Storm Bret just three hours later, owing to a quick increase in winds and deep central convection.

Situated along a weakness in the subtropical ridge, Bret drifted very slowly southward during the initial stages of its existence. Though traces of dry air approached it from the west, the cyclone continued to strengthen, as prominent bands of deep thunderstorms tightened around it eastern semicircle. Satellite images displayed a disorganized eye-like feature on July 18, suggesting a rather sharp increase in strength. Following its peak, Bret began to accelerate toward the northeast in response to building high pressure in the area. It fluctuated little in intensity for several hours, although a combination of high wind shear and a lack of tropical moisture inhibited further development. By July 19, the circulation center had become exposed and devoid of deep convection, and the storm weakened to  winds upon moving through the increasingly hostile environment. Despite the unfavorable conditions, Bret retained this intensity for the next couple of days as it briefly slowed, with a distinct low-level circulation and a few patches of persistent thunderstorms over its southwestern quadrant.

Early on July 20, the heavily sheared cyclone began to reaccelerate within the deepening southwesterly wind flow. Over the next day, Bret continued to deteriorate in organization; however, a brief decline in the upper winds allowed intermittent bursts of convection to redevelop south of the exposed center. Bret eventually weakened to a tropical depression over cool ocean temperatures early on July 22, once again lacking significant convection while increasing in forward speed. Forecasters at the NHC noted that Bret remained "a maverick tropical cyclone by refusing to dissipate despite experiencing very hostile wind shear conditions," with ship data indications of prevailing strong winds. During the next several hours, the remnant low of Bret continued to move northeastward out into the Atlantic, until it dissipated on July 23.

Preparations and impact

Bahamas

Upon the formation of a depression, the government of the Bahamas issued a tropical storm watch for northwestern islands of the nation. It was upgraded to a tropical storm warning on July 18, when the storm showed signs of intensification. Further south, a severe weather warning was in effect for New Providence and Andros Island, and authorities urged small craft operators to secure their vessels. The warnings were discontinued later that day as Bret turned away from the territory.

Since it initially moved little, Bret brought prolonged overcast conditions to much of the northern Bahamas, with most of the activity over the Abaco Islands and Grand Bahama. An estimated  of precipitation fell in Abaco over the weekend of July 16–17. The rain led to the cancellation of a local Little League baseball match. Outer rainbands spawned a waterspout that touched down on eastern Paradise Island, accompanied by lightning strikes and torrents. Nevertheless, locals considered the storm's impact to be generally positive, as its rains aided in alleviating mild drought conditions across the nation.

United States and Bermuda
Strong rip currents swept dozens of people out to sea, but all remained unharmed and were quickly rescued. Additionally, the waves washed ashore venomous jellyfish that stung more than 200 people near coastal beaches. Scattered funnel clouds and waterspouts were reported overseas, though the phenomena dissipated soon thereafter without affecting land. Onshore, Bret's effects were minimal; weak morning showers and breezy winds briefly brushed Brevard and Volusia Counties. As the storm lifted out of the area, it drew in a large mass of dry air, limiting chances of much-needed rain to subdue a large wildfire in the Okefenokee Swamp.

Light showers from the precursor front skirted Bermuda prior to tropical development, with 24-hour precipitation totals of no more than  recorded on the territory. Moisture brought on by the storm from afar enhanced rainfall that ended months of dry conditions in Bermuda;  of precipitation fell at L.F. Wade International Airport on July 18, with an additional  recorded the next day. Although the rains proved to be mostly beneficial, minor flooding affected some local businesses in poor-drainage areas.

See also 

Other storms of the same name
Hurricane Shary (2010)

References

External links 

 The NHC's advisory archive on Tropical Storm Bret
 The NHC's graphics archive on Tropical Storm Bret

Bret (2011)
Bret (2011)
2011 in the Bahamas
Bret (2011)
Bret